The 2010 Minnesota–Duluth Bulldogs football team was an American football team that won the 2010 NCAA Division II national championship. The team was the first in NCAA Division II history to twice compile a perfect 15–0 record.

The team represented the University of Minnesota Duluth in the Northern Sun Intercollegiate Conference (NSIC) during the 2010 NCAA Division II football season. In their eighth season under head coach Bob Nielson, the Bulldogs compiled a perfect 15–0 record, outscored opponents by a total of 595 to 190, and won the NSIC championship. 

The team advanced to the NCAA Division II playoffs and won the national championship by defeating , 20–17, in the championship game. The Bulldogs won on a 32-yard field goal by David Nadeau as time expired. 

Kiel Fechtelkotter was the team captain.  Assistant coaches included Curt Wiese (offensive coordinator), Peter Lue, and Mike McHugh.

The team's statistical leaders included Brad Foss with 1,151 rushing yards, Chase Vogler with 1,913 passing yards and 2,818 yards of total offense, D.J. Winfield with 990 receiving yards, Isaac Odim with 19 touchdowns, and David Nadeau with 119 points scored.

The team played its home games at James S. Malosky Stadium in Duluth, Minnesota.

Schedule

References

Minnesota–Duluth
Minnesota Duluth Bulldogs football seasons
Northern Sun Intercollegiate Conference football champion seasons
NCAA Division II Football Champions
College football undefeated seasons
Minnesota–Duluth Bulldogs football